Oregon Route 238 is an Oregon state highway which runs between the cities of Grants Pass, Oregon and  Medford, Oregon, and through the historic town of Jacksonville. It lies in Jackson and Josephine County.

Route description
OR 238 begins, at its western terminus, at an interchange with U.S. Route 199 and Oregon Route 99 in Grants Pass.  The highway heads south from there, eventually turning to the southeast, skirting the southern edge of the Rogue Valley, and the foothills of the Siskiyou Mountains.  It continues in a general southeasterly direction for quite a while, and then turns northeast towards Jacksonville.  In Jacksonville, OR 238 is contiguous with W and E California St, then turns north at N 5th St. Approaching the western outskirts of Medford, the highway originally turned at W Main St and terminated at US Hwy 99. The new route does not turn east at W Main St, but continues north contiguous with Hanley Rd., then turns east at Rossanley Dr. When Rossanley Dr ends at Sage Rd, OR 238 continues northeast until it reaching its eastern terminus at an intersection with Oregon Route 99 (Court and Riverside St), which is also the western terminus of Oregon Route 62.

Major intersections

References

238
Transportation in Josephine County, Oregon
Transportation in Medford, Oregon